The 1998 Shanghai Open was a men's tennis tournament played on indoor carpet in Shanghai, China that was part of the International Series of the 1998 ATP Tour. It was the third edition of the tournament and was held from 5 October – 12 October.

Seeds
Champion seeds are indicated in bold text while text in italics indicates the round in which those seeds were eliminated.

Draw

Finals

Top half

Bottom half

References

Singles
Kingfisher Airlines Tennis Open